Volpe means "fox" in Italian. As a surname, it may refer to:
 Alessandro Volpe, Italian footballer
 Anthony Volpe, American baseball player
 Francesco Volpe, Italian footballer
 John A. Volpe (1906–1994), former Governor of Massachusetts and U.S. Secretary of Transportation
 John A. Volpe National Transportation Systems Center
 Joe Volpe (born 1947), Canadian politician
 Joseph Volpe (opera manager) (born 1940), general manager of the Metropolitan Opera in New York
 Justin Anthony Volpe (born 1971 or 1972), New York City police officer convicted and imprisoned for assaulting Abner Louima
 Michael Volpe (born 1987), Michael Volpe known as Clams Casino
 Paul Volpe (mobster) (1927–1983), Canadian mobster
 Paul Volpe (poker player), American poker player
 Petra Volpe (born 1970), Swiss screenwriter and film director
 The Volpe Brothers Pittsburgh crime family - The Volpe brothers were the leaders of the "Neapolitan faction" and controlled illegal rackets throughout the Turtle Creek Valley and Wilmerding.

See also
 Michel Vulpe Founder of i4i
Surnames from nicknames

References

Italian-language surnames